The 1897–98 Scottish Cup was the 25th season of Scotland's most prestigious football knockout competition. The cup was won by holders Rangers when they beat first-time finalists Kilmarnock 2–0 in the final at the second Hampden Park for a third victory in the competition.

Calendar

First round

First round replay

Second round

Quarter-final

Semi-finals

Semi-finals replay

Semi-finals second replay

Final

Teams

See also
 1897–98 in Scottish football

References

RSSF Scottish Cup 97-98

1899-1900
Cup
Cup